TGF may refer to:

Medicine
 Tubuloglomerular feedback, a reflex of the nephrons in the kidney
 Transforming growth factor, either of two classes of polypeptide growth factors (TGF-α and TGF-β)

Science
 Terrestrial gamma-ray flash, a burst of gamma rays produced in the Earth's atmosphere, generally associated with lightning
 Tidal Generating Force, an effect of gravity responsible for creating tides
 Trivial Graph Format, a text-based file format for describing graphs

Entertainment
 The Games Factory, video game development software created by Clickteam
 The Gracious Few, an American rock group from York, Pennsylvania

Other
 Chali language, by ISO 639 code

See also